Chenoderus venustus is a species of beetle in the family Cerambycidae. It was described by Fairmaire and Germain in 1861.

References

Unxiini
Beetles described in 1861